Juan González de Vega (15 July 1917 — unknown) was a Cuban chess player and Cuban Chess Championship four-times winner (1942, 1943, 1951, 1952).

Biography
From the early 1940s to the early 1960s Juan González de Vega was one of the leading Cuban chess players. He four times won the Cuban Chess Championship: 1942, 1943, 1951, and 1952. In 1946, in Manhattan Chess Club he won the U.S. Blitz Chess Championship.

Juan González de Vega played for Cuba in the Chess Olympiad:
 In 1952, at third board in the 10th Chess Olympiad in Helsinki (+6, =7, -3).

In 1962, in Havana he participated in 1st Capablanca Memorial.

In 1960s Juan González de Vega emigrated to the United States and worked as surgery doctor at Manhattan's West Side Hospital.

References

External links

Juan González de Vega chess games at 365chess.com

1917 births
Year of death missing
Cuban chess players
Chess Olympiad competitors
20th-century chess players